Yendorian Tales Book I: Chapter 2 is a role-playing video game written for DOS in 1996.

Plot
Beginning with a seemingly insignificant quest, the hero was led to the mysterious Lost Isles of Yendor. Following the trail of a group of evil mages, the hero encountered civilisations of Gnomes, Elves, and Halflings. Throughout the journey, the hero learned that the evil Paltivar had found a way to communicate through portals. He was able to gain the loyalty of three mages, Simech, Cyril and Irudon. These mages unlawfully gathered many powerful reagents to construct a quartz chamber in Thaine. Eventually, the hero was able to defeat them. Unfortunately, their chamber was already complete, awaiting the eruption of a volcano. When filled with lava, this chamber will be activated and allow Paltivar to be freed from his eternal prison.

History
Yendorian Tales Book I: Chapter 2 was developed by SW Games and released as shareware by Spectrum Pacific Publishing during 1996.

External links

Yendorian Tales Book I: Chapter 2 Downloads

1996 video games
DOS games
DOS-only games
Role-playing video games
Video games developed in Australia